Natacha Atlas / Transglobal Underground is a video album by Belgian singer Natacha Atlas. It was released by Mantra Recordings on 24 May 2005. The video album is a compilation of Atlas' music videos, video filmed with Transglobal Underground, and live performances from Union Chapel in London, England.

Track listing 
Natacha Atlas videos
 "Mistaneek"
 "Yalla Chant"
 "Leysh Nat' Arak"
 "Amulet"
 "One Brief Moment"
 "Mon Amie La Rose"
 "Mish Fadilak"
 "Mish Fadilak" (French version)
 "When I Close My Eyes"
Transglobal Underground videos
 "Temple Head"
 "Taal Zaman"
 "Protean"
 "Lookee Here"
Natacha Atlas Live in Concert at Union Chapel
 "When I Close My Eyes"
 "Fakrenha"
 "Moustahil"
 "Eye of the Duck"
 "I Put a Spell on You"
 "Mon Amie La Rose"
 Interview

References 

Natacha Atlas video albums
2005 video albums
Live video albums
Music video compilation albums
2005 live albums
2005 compilation albums